Amberin Zaman is a Turkish journalist and a senior correspondent for Al-Monitor. Having started as a journalist in Turkey, Zaman contributes to various newspapers throughout the world. Her writing is centered on minority rights issues in Turkey.

Life and career
Amberin Zaman is the daughter of Arshad-uz Zaman a former Bangladeshi Ambassador and member of parliament. Her mother is a Turk from Istanbul. She was born in New York City, New York and has studied in Switzerland. She returned from the United States where she became Turkey's correspondent for the Los Angeles Times, The Economist, The Daily Telegraph, and The Washington Post in 1992. After being sacked from Habertürk, Zaman was employed with the liberal newspaper Taraf. She also specialises in Kurdish issues and is currently a Public Policy Scholar at the Woodrow Wilson Center for International Scholars in Washington DC She additionally is a columnist for the independent online Turkish news portal Diken and for Al Monitor.

Views and controversies
Amberin Zaman has been a supporter of minority rights in Turkey. She is a proponent of normalization of Turkish-Armenian relations and regularly discusses the Armenian genocide in her columns. In 2014, she participated in a conference by the Hrant Dink Foundation that was dedicated to Armenian-Turkish reconciliation. Zaman, who recognizes the Armenian genocide as fact, believes that the Turkish government must reconcile with its history concerning the Armenians. In response to the Turkish government's letter of condolences to Armenians on 24 April 2014, Zaman declared:

Zaman states that she is a target of a vilification campaign by pro-government media. In 2013, Amberin Zaman was sacked as a journalist for HaberTurk because of columns that were considered unacceptable by the government.

Zaman was attacked on Twitter for reporting the Gezi Park protests. She described the attacks as "abusive, violent and sexual".

In 2014, the Prime Minister of Turkey, Recep Tayyip Erdoğan, called Amberin Zaman "A militant in the guise of a journalist, a shameless woman... Know your place!" and "scum" at two successive election rallies. In a response to the accusations by the Prime Minister, Zaman wrote a column in the newspaper Taraf entitled "First be a human!" (Turkish: Önce insan ol!) A public apology campaign had started with numerous human rights groups and journalist associations throughout the world. Erdogan's rhetoric was condemned by a representative of the Organization for Security and Cooperation, The Economist, and the Turkish Journalists' Association. The Equality Monitoring Women's Group of Turkey collected 130 signatures demanding that Erdogan apologize for his language.

Zaman "experienced a mass attack on Twitter" for her reporting on the Charlie Hebdo shooting in January 2015. Zaman stated: "It's like a public lynching. It has made me frightened for my physical safety when I am out in the streets."

In November 2022 she experienced a smear campaign launched against her by pro-Turkish-government media outlets and social media users after she met with Turkey’s main opposition leader Kemal Kılıçdaroğlu in London.

Personal life
She is married to Joseph Pennington, the US Deputy Assistant Secretary of State for Iraq.

References

External links
CivilNet interview with Amberin Zaman: Dissident Voices Being Silenced in Turkey (YouTube video)
CivilNet interview with Amberin Zaman: People Don't Fear Authorities Anymore (YouTube video)
Amberin Zaman during a Hrant Dink conference on Turkish and Armenian reconciliation (YouTube video in Turkish)

Turkish women journalists
Living people
Journalists from New York City
Minority rights activists
Date of birth missing (living people)
Year of birth missing (living people)